The Roman Catholic Diocese of Condom was a French bishopric based in Condom from 1317 to 1801.

It comprised four archdeaconries : Condom itself, Bruilhois, Villefranche and Nérac. In 1763 these totaled circa 140 parishes.

Abbey of Condom 
The diocese grew out of a much older abbey at Condom whose origin remains obscure. After the original monastery's destruction during the ninth century Norman raids or, more likely, the Saracene mid tenth century raids, on its ruins a Benedictine cenobium with a church devoted to Saint Peter was built in 1041, which over time enjoyed many donations and received privileges, confirmed by Popes. One of its monks wrote the Historia abbatiae Condomensis on its history, but it's held unreliable.

History 
 The Diocese of Condom was established as such on 17 July 1317 by transforming the abbey into a bishopric: its elevation was confirmed on 13 August 1317 by Pope John XXII in the papal bull Salvator noster, assigning to it a territory from its mother Diocese of Agen south of the Garonne. The abbey church became its cathedral, the last abbot Raymond de Galard was promoted its first bishop, suffragan of the Archdiocese of Bordeaux. 
 After great devastations and moral decay throughout the bishopric during the Hundred Years' War, bishop Jean Marre rebuilt the cathedral and many churches and published an Enchiridion, as Christian doctrinal manual for the diocesan clergy. The religious wars against the Huguenots brought more bloodshed and devastation, but the wreck of the cathedral was bought off.
 Its most famous incumbent, Bossuet, championed moral reveil and reasserted clerical discipline, calling a diocesan synod in 1761, grouped the parishes into 'conferences' within the four archdeaconries and resigned, unable to respect the duty of residence he has imposed on his clergy, due to his many obligations elsewhere
 During the French Revolution, the diocese was dissolved in favor of a constitutional bishop for a short-lived schismatic Diocese of Gers
 Under the Napoleonic Concordat of 1801 it was formally restored, but only to be merged into its once mother see, the Diocese of Agen, on 29 November 1801 
 On 29 June 1908 Condom's title was united with the Archdiocese of Auch, which from its 182 restoration had already acquired most of Condom's former territory

Episcopal Ordinaries 

Suffragan Bishops of Condom 
 Raymond de Galard (1317.08.13 – death 1340.03.23)
 Pierre de Galard (1340.10.25 – 1369)
 Bernard Alaman (1369.12.03 – death 1401.03.09)
 Hugues Raimbaud (1401 – death 1405.10.11)
 (1405–1408 : name not known)
 Aymeric Noël (1408.03.10 – 1418), next Bishop of Castres (France) (1418 – death 1421.10)
 Pierre Assalbit, Augustinians (O.E.S.A.) (1419.08.23 – 1421.01.08), next Bishop of Alet (1421.01.08 – death 1441)
 Jean Coursier (1421.01.08 – death 1454)
 Guillaume d'Étampes (1454 – 1458), previously Bishop of Montauban (France) (1452.01.03 – 1454)
 Guy de Montbrun (1461 – 1486)
 Antoine de Pompadour (1486.05.15 – 1496.10.11)
 Jean Bilhères de Lagraulas, Benedictine Congregation of Cluny (O.S.B. Clun.) (1496.10.26 – 1499.08.06), previously Bishop of Lombez (France) (1473.07.05 – 1499.08.04), created Cardinal-Priest of S. Sabina (1493.09.23 – 1499.08.06); also Bishop of Viviers (France) (1498.02.14 – 1499.08.06)
Apostolic Administrator Father Amanieu d’Albret (1499.09.13 – 1500?), while Apostolic Administrator of Diocese of Saint-Bertrand-de-Comminges (France) (1499.07.19 – 1514); later created Cardinal-Deacon of S. Nicola in Carcere (1500.10.05 – 1520.12.20), Apostolic Administrator of Diocese of Pamiers (France) (1502.03.14 – 1506), Apostolic Administrator of Diocese of Vannes (Brittany, France) (1504.01.08 – 1504.10.14), Apostolic Administrator of Diocese of Bazas (France) (1504.12.04 – 1520.12.20), Apostolic Administrator of Diocese of Lescar (France) (1507.10.06 – 1515.06.20), Apostolic Administrator of Diocese of Pamplona (Spain) (1510.05.13 – 1512), Apostolic Administrator of Pamiers (again) (1514.05.15 – 1514.08.18), Apostolic Administrator of Diocese of Couserans (France) (1515.06.20 – 1515.06.25), Apostolic Administrator of Pamiers (again) (1515.06.23 – 1520.12.20), Apostolic Administrator of Pamplona (again) (1517 – 1520.12.20), Protodeacon of Sacred College of Cardinals (1520.09.03 – death 1520.12.20)
 Jean Marre (1500? – death 1521.10.13)
 Hérard de Grossoles-Flamarens (1521.10.19 – death 1544)
 Charles de Pisseleu (1545.06.15 – death 1564), previously Bishop of Mende (France) (1538.10.13 – 1545.06.15)
 Robert de Gontaut-Biron (1565 – death 1569.08.25)
 Jean de Monluc (1570 – 1581) 
 Jean du Chemin (1581 – death 1616), succeeding as former Coadjutor Bishop of Condom (? – 1581)
 Antoine de Coues (1616 – death 1647), succeeding as previous Titular Bishop of Auzia (1604.03.15 – 1616) and Coadjutor Bishop of Condom (1604.03.15 – 1616)
 Jean d'Estrades (1648.02.14 – 1658)), previously Bishop of Périgueux (France) (1646.07 – 1648.02.14)
 Charles-Louis de Lorraine (1659.11.10 – death 1668.06.01)
BIOS TO ELABORATE
1669–1671 : Jacques-Bénigne Bossuet (
1671–1693 : Jacques de Goyon de Matignon (
1693 : Mathieu-Isaure d'Hervaut (
1693–1734 : Louis Milon (
1735–1758 : Emmanuel de Cossé-Brissac (
1758–1760 : Louis de Montmorency-Laval (
1760–1763 : Étienne-Charles de Loménie de Brienne (
 Alexandre-César d'Anterroches (1763.06.05 – death 1793.01.28), exiled to London from 15 September 1792 during the French Revolution

See also 
 List of Catholic dioceses in France

Notes

References

Sources and external links
 GCatholic - former bishopric
 GCatholic, with satellite map - former cathedral of St. Pierre (Peter)
 Profile at catholic-hierarchy.org
 Map of the bishopric on Gallica.bnf.fr
 Bibliography
 Denis de Sainte-Marthe, Gallia christiana, vol. II, Paris 1720, coll. 953-974
 C. Bourgeat, lemma 'Condom', in Dictionnaire d'Histoire et de Géographie ecclésiastiques, vol. XIII, Paris 1956, coll. 424-438
 Pius Bonifacius Gams, Series episcoporum Ecclesiae Catholicae, Leipzig 1931, p. 540
 Konrad Eubel, Hierarchia Catholica Medii Aevi, vol. 1, pp. 201–202; vol. 2, p. 133; vol. 3, p. 175; vol. 4, p. 159; vol. 5, p. 168; vol. 6, p. 178
 Papal bulla Salvator noster, in Bullarum diplomatum et privilegiorum sanctorum Romanorum pontificum Taurinensis editio, Vol. IV, p. 249
 Bulla Qui Christi Domini, in Bullarii romani continuatio, vol. XI, Rome 1845, pp. 245–249
 Decree Romanos Pontifices, ASS 41 (1908), p. 668

Former Roman Catholic dioceses in France
Suppressed Roman Catholic dioceses